Brigadier Tristram Hugh "Tim" Massy-Beresford,  (10 April 1896 – 21 July 1987) was a British Army officer who fought in the Second World War. He created "Massy Force", an unorthodox military unit to fight against the Japanese prior to the Fall of Singapore and to conduct a guerrilla campaign afterwards; he also led the funeral procession at the funeral of King George V.

Military career
Massy-Beresford was educated at Eton College before entering the Royal Military College, Sandhurst, from which he was commissioned into the Rifle Brigade (The Prince Consort's Own). He served in France during the First World War, but was wounded badly in 1915 and was not able to rejoin his regiment until 1918; he earned a Military Cross, but was wounded again when a bullet passed through his chest, killing the man behind. After the end of the war, Massy-Beresford was posted to the Dardanelles during the Chanak Crisis, a confrontation between Britain and Turkey in 1920. Afterwards, he was posted to the North-West Frontier (the border between British India and Afghanistan). In 1935, Massy-Beresford led the funeral procession of King George V, marching alone, ahead of the main column. He went on to serve at the Royal Military College of Canada, before returning to Britain early in the Second World War.

Massy-Beresford was posted to Changi, Singapore, in 1942, where he was surprised by the lack of preparations that had been made for the forthcoming Japanese invasion. He assembled a force of 2,000 men from the Cambridgeshire Regiment, Suffolk Regiment, and Sikh Regiment with the intention of mounting a defence, but his plans were twice countermanded by senior officers. By the fall of Singapore, Massy-Beresford felt that he could have evacuated the majority of the civilians, collected rainwater, and put up some defence against the Japanese, but the garrison was surrendered and Massy-Beresford was taken prisoner of war and taken to Taiwan and then to Moukden in China. He was liberated by the Russians in 1945 and sent home around the Pacific. He was awarded the Distinguished Service Order for his efforts in Singapore. He was promoted to permanent brigadier in June 1948, and served as aide-de-camp to King George VI in 1948, and retired in 1949.

References

External links
Generals of World War II

1896 births
1987 deaths
British Army personnel of World War I
Recipients of the Military Cross
Companions of the Distinguished Service Order
Graduates of the Royal Military College, Sandhurst
People educated at Eton College
Rifle Brigade officers
Members of the Royal Victorian Order
British Army brigadiers of World War II
Academic staff of the Royal Military College of Canada
British World War II prisoners of war
World War II prisoners of war held by Japan